The 2017–18 Coupe de France preliminary rounds, Centre-Val de Loire make up the qualifying competition to decide which teams from the French Centre-Val de Loire region take part in the main competition from the seventh round.

preliminary round 
The matches in Centre-Val de Loire were played on 20 August and 3 September 2017.

preliminary round results: Centre-Val de Loire

First round 
The matches in Centre-Val de Loire were played between 19 August and 10 September 2017.

First round results: Centre-Val de Loire

Second round 
These matches were played between 30 August and 17 September 2017.

Second round results: Centre-Val de Loire

Third round 
These matches were played between 9 and 24 September 2017.

Third round results: Centre-Val de Loire

Fourth round 
These matches were played between 23 September and 1 October 2017.

Fourth round results: Centre-Val de Loire

Fifth round 
These matches were played on 7 and 8 October 2017.

Fifth round results: Centre-Val de Loire

Sixth round 
These matches were played on 21 and 22 October 2017.

Sixth round results: Centre-Val de Loire

Notes

References 

2017–18 Coupe de France